Chenar (also Romanized as Chenār) is a village in Azghand Rural District, Shadmehr District, Mahvelat County, Razavi Khorasan Province, Iran. At the 2006 census, its population was 1,076, in 271 families.

References 

Populated places in Mahvelat County